Kimberley Smith (née Purcell; born 18 June 1982) is an Australian netball player in the ANZ Championship, playing for the New South Wales Swifts. She played for the Hunter Jaegers in years up to and including 2006. In 2007, she played for the Sydney Swifts and was key to ANZ Grand Final victory in that year against the Melbourne Phoenix, playing as wing defence. 
In 2008, she became one of 18 members in the Australian netball squad, although she was not included in the final team. Smith was selected to be in the initial squad in 2010, but was again unsuccessful in joining the final team. Smith is known for her athleticism, as she's able to play a strong one-on-one style of play.

Smith announced her retirement from top level netball on 2 September 2011.

References
2009 New South Wales Swifts profile. Retrieved on 2009-03-29.

1982 births
Living people
Australian netball players
Netball players from New South Wales
Sydney Swifts players
New South Wales Swifts players
Hunter Jaegers players
Sydney Sandpipers players